Coiled-coil-helix-coiled-coil-helix domain-containing protein 10, mitochondrial, also known as Protein N27C7-4 is a protein that in humans is encoded by the CHCHD10 gene.

Structure
The CHCHD10 gene is located on the q arm of chromosome 22 at position 11.23 and it spans 2,138 base pairs. The CHCHD10 gene produces a 14.9 kDa protein composed of 149 amino acids. It is enriched at cristae junctions in the intermembrane space of the mitochondria. The structure of the protein contains a nonstructured N-terminal region, a hydrophobic helix and a C-terminal CHCH domain which contains a Cx(9)C motif and two additional cysteines. A total of four cysteines are predicted to form two disulfide bonds.

Function
This gene encodes for a mitochondrial protein that is enriched at cristae junctions in the intermembrane space. It may play a role in cristae morphology maintenance or oxidative phosphorylation.

Clinical significance
CHCHD10-related disorders include Myopathy, isolated mitochondrial, autosomal dominant (IMMD), Frontotemporal dementia and/or amyotrophic lateral sclerosis 2 (FTDALS2), Spinal muscular atrophy, Jokela type (SMAJ).

Frontotemporal dementia and/or amyotrophic lateral sclerosis 2 (FTDALS2)
Frontotemporal dementia and/or amyotrophic lateral sclerosis 2 (FTDALS2) is a neurodegenerative disorder with high intrafamilial variation with phenotypes such as 
frontotemporal dementia and/or amyotrophic lateral sclerosis. Frontotemporal dementia is characterized by frontal and temporal lobe atrophy associated with neuronal loss, gliosis, and dementia. Patients exhibit progressive changes in social, behavioral, and/or language function. Amyotrophic lateral sclerosis is characterized by the death of motor neurons in the brain, brainstem, and spinal cord, resulting in fatal paralysis.

Spinal muscular atrophy, Jokela type (SMAJ)
Spinal muscular atrophy, Jokela type (SMAJ) is an autosomal dominant, slowly progressive, lower motor neuron disease. SMAJ is characterized by adult-onset of muscle cramps and fasciculations affecting the proximal and distal muscles of the upper and lower limbs. The disorder results in weakness and mild muscle atrophy later in life.

Myopathy, isolated mitochondrial, autosomal dominant (IMMD)
Myopathy, isolated mitochondrial, autosomal dominant (IMMD) is a mitochondrial myopathy presenting with severe exercise intolerance, progressive proximal weakness, and lactic acidemia. The disorder is slowly progressive, with later involvement of facial muscles, muscles of the upper limbs, and distal muscles.

Others
Mutations in CHCHD10 has also been found to be associated with cerebellar ataxia, frontotemporal dementia (FTD), and other mitochondrial diseases.

Interactions

CHCHD10 has been known to interact with C1QBP, CLPX, FAF1, RNASEH1, ZNF444, KLF13, and other proteins.

References

Genes on human chromosome 22
RNA splicing